Gray-New Gloucester High School is a public high school located in Gray, Maine, United States. It houses grades 9–12, and serves the towns of Gray and New Gloucester, Maine.  The school opened in 1962.

Athletics
Gray-New Gloucester High School is a Class B school in Maine. The school offers Volleyball, Cheerleading, Cross Country, Field Hockey, Football, Golf, Soccer, Alpine Skiing, Basketball (Boys/Girls/Unified), Ice Hockey, Indoor Track, Wrestling, Nordic Skiing, Baseball, Outdoor Track, Softball, and Lacrosse.

Co-Curricular
Gray-New High School offers these activities for students to participate in: Band, Gay-Straight-Transgender Alliance, Community Service Club, National Honor Society, Student Council, Literary Magazine, Civil Rights, Class Officers, Model UN, Newspaper, Yearbook, Chorus, Drama, Green Tree Society, Pi-Cone Math Team, and Robotics.

References

Gray, Maine
Public high schools in Maine
High schools in Cumberland County, Maine
New Gloucester, Maine
Educational institutions established in 1962
1962 establishments in Maine